Miss Universe Vietnam 2019 was the fourth edition of the Miss Universe Vietnam pageant. The finale, hosted by Trấn Thành and Hoàng Oanh, was held on December 7, 2019, at Crown Center in Nha Trang, Khánh Hòa. H'Hen Niê crowned Nguyễn Trần Khánh Vân as her successor at the end of the event as Miss Universe Vietnam 2020 to represent Vietnam at the Miss Universe 2020 competition in Hollywood, Florida, where Khánh Vân finished in the Top 21. On November 20, 2021, Nguyễn Huỳnh Kim Duyên was appointed as Miss Universe Vietnam 2021 and represented the country at the Miss Universe 2021 competition, finishing in the Top 16.

Results 
Color keys

Special Awards

Order of announcement

Top 15
Lương Ý Như
Kiều Thị Thúy Hằng
Nguyễn Huỳnh Kim Duyên
Vũ Quỳnh Trang
Phạm Thị Anh Thư
Phạm Hồng Thúy Vân
Vũ Thị Hòa Liên
Nguyễn Thị Hương Ly
Nguyễn Trần Khánh Vân
Lê Thu Trang
Nguyễn Đặng Tường Linh
Lê Hoàng Phương
Lâm Thị Bích Tuyền
Nguyễn Diana
Đào Thị Hà

Top 10
Phạm Thị Anh Thư
Lê Hoàng Phương
Nguyễn Thị Hương Ly
Nguyễn Huỳnh Kim Duyên
Nguyễn Trần Khánh Vân
Vũ Quỳnh Trang
Đào Thị Hà
Lê Thu Trang
Phạm Hồng Thúy Vân
Lương Ý Như

Top 5
Đào Thị Hà
Nguyễn Thị Hương Ly
Nguyễn Trần Khánh Vân
Phạm Hồng Thúy Vân
Nguyễn Huỳnh Kim Duyên

Top 3
Nguyễn Trần Khánh Vân
Nguyễn Huỳnh Kim Duyên
Phạm Hồng Thúy Vân

Format 
Similar to the 2017 edition, the competition is accompanied by a reality TV series called I Am Miss Universe Vietnam in which the top 60 contestants are put through challenges and training programs in each episode. However, this year, 15 contestants will be eliminated before the preliminary round.

Top 45 contestants will move on to participate in the preliminary competition on December 3 in áo dài, swimsuit and evening gown. In the finale on December 7, the contestants will be trimmed down to a top 15, who will proceed to compete in opening statement and swimsuit. After that, the top 10 contestants will advance to compete in the evening gown competition. Five contestants will move forward to an interview round that will determine who the top 3 contestants would be. This top 3 will participate in another question and answer round to find the eventual Miss Universe Vietnam 2019 winner, who will be appointed as Miss Universe Vietnam 2020 to compete at Miss Universe 2020.

Judging panel 
The judging panel for the competition includes:

 Võ Thị Xuân Trang – John Robert Powers School principal
 Lê Diệp Linh – ergonomist
 Nguyễn Công Trí – fashion designer
 Phạm Thị Thanh Hằng, Miss Model Photogenic Vietnam 2002 – fashion model, actress, beauty pageant titleholder, Miss Intercontinental Vietnam 2005
 Trần Thị Hương Giang, Miss Hải Dương 2006, Miss World Vietnam 2009  – beauty pageant titleholder
 Vũ Thu Phương – businesswoman, fashion model
 Samuel Hoàng – photographer

Contestants

Top 45 final round

Top 60 preliminary

I Am Miss Universe Vietnam

Contestants 
After a nationwide audition process, top 60 contestants were selected to continue to compete for the title. The following list includes each contestant's ranking after each episode of the series, based on the score of their performance.

Episodes

References

Beauty pageants in Vietnam
2019 beauty pageants
Vietnamese awards